Patrick Sutter (born July 6, 1970) is a former Swiss professional ice hockey defenceman who last played for EV Zug in Switzerland's National League A.

Sutter has participated as a member of the Swiss national team in numerous international tournaments, including the 2002 Winter Olympics.

Career statistics

Regular season and playoffs

International

References

External links

1970 births
Living people
EHC Olten players
EV Zug players
HC Lugano players
Ice hockey players at the 2002 Winter Olympics
Olympic ice hockey players of Switzerland
Swiss ice hockey defencemen
Sportspeople from Basel-Landschaft